Sochio Kato (born 13 August 1948) is a Japanese former professional tennis player.

Kato featured in Japan's 1975 and 1977 Davis Cup campaigns, winning two singles and two doubles rubbers. While on tour with the Davis Cup squad he competed in the main draw of the 1975 Australian Open. During his career he also appeared in the qualifying draws for the French Open and Wimbledon.

See also
List of Japan Davis Cup team representatives

References

External links
 
 
 

1948 births
Living people
Japanese male tennis players
20th-century Japanese people